Paradoxecia is a genus of moths in the family Sesiidae.

Species
 Paradoxecia gravis (Walker, 1865)
 Paradoxecia beibengensis Yu & Kallies, 2019
 Paradoxecia chura Arita, Kimura & Owada, 2009
 Paradoxecia dizona (Hampson, 1919)  
 Paradoxecia fukiensis Gorbunov & Arita, 1997
 Paradoxecia karubei Kallies & Arita, 2001
 Paradoxecia kishidai Yu & Arita, 2019
 Paradoxecia luteocincta Kallies & Arita, 2001
 Paradoxecia myrmekomorpha (Bryk, 1947)
 Paradoxecia polyzona Yu & Kallies, 2019
 Paradoxecia radiata Kallies, 2002
 Paradoxecia similis Arita & Gorbunov, 2001
 Paradoxecia taiwana Arita & Gorbunov, 2001
 Paradoxecia tristis Kallies & Arita, 2001
 Paradoxecia tuzovi Gorbunov, 2021
 Paradoxecia vietnamica Gorbunov & Arita, 1997

References

Sesiidae